Psammetichus or Psammeticus, latinizations of Psamtik or Psametek, may refer to:

Ancient Egyptian pharaohs of the 26th Saite Dynasty
Psamtik I
Psamtik II
Psamtik III

Others
Psammetichus IV, a rebel during the 27th Dynasty